The Industrial and Commercial Bank of China (Macau) Limited formerly known as the Seng Heng Bank Limited established in 2009, is the third largest locally incorporated bank in Macau, China. In August 2007, Industrial and Commercial Bank of China (ICBC) acquired a 79.9 percent share in the bank, which became a subsidiary of ICBC. In July 2009, the merger was finalized and renamed ICBC (Macau) as such all branches of Seng Heng Bank are now re-branded as ICBC (Macau).

History
The bank was acquired by Sociedade de Turismo e Diversoes de Macau S.A. in 1989, and is a wholly owned subsidiary. It was said to be the first bank in Greater China to offer a pre-paid debit card.

References

External links

 Industrial and Commercial Bank of China (Macau) Limited
 Industrial and Commercial Bank of China (Macau) Limited

Industrial and Commercial Bank of China
Banks of Macau
Banks established in 1972